The 2012 Junior Pan Pacific Swimming Championships were held from 23 to 27 August 2012 at the Veterans Memorial Aquatic Center in Honolulu, Hawaii, United States. Pool swimming competition was conducted in a long course (50 metre) pool and open water swimming was conducted in the Pacific Ocean.

Events were contested in a preliminaries-finals format with a maximum of two athletes per country eligible to compete in each the Championship Final and the Consolation Final.

Results

Men

Women

Medal table

Championships records set
The following Championships records were set during the course of competition.

References

External links
 Results
 Results book

Swimming competitions in the United States
2012 in swimming
August 2012 sports events in the United States
2012 in sports in Hawaii